Alpha Squadron may refer to:

 Alpha Squadron (comics) is the name of a team of mutants in the Marvel Universe (comics), featured in "The New Mutants"
 Alternatively, Alpha Squadron could refer to a military squadron of the Terran Confederacy in the StarCraft series